African Children is a double LP by Lester Bowie recorded for the Italian Horo label and released in 1978. It features performances by Bowie, Arthur Blythe, Amina Claudine Myers, Malachi Favors and Phillip Wilson.

Track listing

Side One
 "Amina" (Bowie, Blythe, Myers, Favors, Wilson) – 19:28

Side Two
 "Captain Courageous" -10:40
 "Tricky Slicky" (Bowie, Blythe, Myers, Favors, Wilson) – 10:32

Side Three
 "Chili MacDonald (Bowie, Blythe, Myers, Favors, Wilson) – 20:00

Side Four
 "For Fela" – 20:16
All compositions by Lester Bowie except as indicated
Recorded on 16 April 1978 at Mama Dog Studio, Rome, Italy

Personnel
Lester Bowie – trumpet
Arthur Blythe – alto saxophone
Amina Claudine Myers – piano, vocals
Malachi Favors – bass
Phillip Wilson – drums

1978 albums
Horo Records albums
Lester Bowie albums